Akashinga is an all-female anti-poaching group in Zimbabwe. The group is the subject of a 2020 documentary titled Akashinga: The Brave Ones.

History 
Akashinga was founded in 2017. The women of Akashinga were recruited by Australian conservationist Damien Mander, founder of the International Anti-Poaching Foundation. The original 16 Akashinga were recruited to be conservation officers for Phundundu Wildlife Park. The word Akashinga means "brave ones" in Shona. Akashinga is an arm of the International Anti-Poaching Foundation.

Operations 
In contrast to other all-female anti-poaching groups such as the Black Mamba Anti-Poaching Unit in South Africa, the rangers of Akashinga are armed. Since 2017, the group has arrested hundreds of poachers.

Rangers 
Many of the Akashinga rangers are vegan. Many of the Akashinga are survivors of domestic abuse and/or sexual assault.

In March 2017, two rangers and a male trainer drowned while crossing a river.

Notable former rangers 

 Tariro Mnangagwa

Akashinga: The Brave Ones 
The short documentary Akashinga: The Brave Ones was directed by Maria Wilhelm. It was produced by Kim Butts, Drew Pulley, and Wilhelm and was executive produced by James Cameron. Akashinga: The Brave Ones premiered in 2020 at the EarthXFilm Festival. It was an official selection of the Tribeca Film Festival and was later broadcast on National Geographic. Akashinga is also available to stream on YouTube.

See also
Black Mamba Anti-Poaching Unit
How Many Elephants
Holly Budge
World Female Ranger Day

References

External links 
 

Animal conservation organizations
Poaching
Nature conservation in Zimbabwe
Animal welfare organisations based in Zimbabwe
Women's organisations based in Zimbabwe
2017 establishments in Zimbabwe
Environmental organizations established in 2017